The Alter A.1 was a single-seat biplane fighter aircraft first flown in February 1917. Built by Ludwig Alter-Werke of Darmstadt to a design by Kallweit and Ketterer, the A.1 was very similar in concept to the Nieuport 11, but not an exact copy.

Design and development
Powered by a 110 hp Goebel Goe II 7-cylinder rotary engine, the A.1 had I-type inter-plane struts and a wood-framed, fabric and plywood covered fuselage, armed with twin, synchronised 7.92 mm LMG 08/15 machine guns.

Development was halted following demonstration to the Idflieg (Inspektion der Fliegertruppe), who judged its performance inadequate and its construction overly flimsy.

Specifications (Alter A.I)

See also

Notes

References

 Gray, Peter & Thetford, Owen. German Aircraft of the First World War. London, Putnam. (2nd Ed.) 1970.

Further reading
 Green, W. & Swanborough, G. (1994). The Complete Book of Fighters. London: Salamander Books.

External links
:fr:Alter A.I

1910s German fighter aircraft
Aircraft first flown in 1917